Johannes Engelmann ( in Mitau, Courland (now Jelgava, Latvia) –  in Dorpat, Livonia (now Tartu, Estonia)) was a Baltic German jurist.

Biography 
Educated at the University of Saint Petersburg he became professor of Russian law at Dorpat in 1860, retaining the chair for 39 years, and delivering his lectures in Russian instead of German after 1887. These lectures covered a wide field and contributed greatly to the advancement of the science of jurisprudence in Russia.

Works 
Among his works are:
 Die Verjahrung nach russischem Privatrecht (1867; in Russian, 1868)
 Die Zwangsvollstreckung auswärtiger richterlicher Urteile in Russland (1884; also translated into French and Russian)
 Das Staatsrecht Russlands (1888)

References 

 

1832 births
1912 deaths
Russian jurists
Saint Petersburg State University alumni
Academic staff of the University of Tartu
Baltic-German people
People from Jelgava